The Afternoon concert is the first part of Elton John's "Night and Day Concert".
This part is released on DVD called "The Breaking Hearts Tour".

Track list
 "Hercules"
 "Rocket Man"
 "Daniel"
 "Restless"
 "Candle in the Wind"
 "The Bitch Is Back"
 "Don't Let the Sun Go Down on Me"
 "Sad Songs (Say So Much)"
 "Bennie and the Jets"

Elton John video albums
1988 video albums
Live video albums
1988 live albums
Elton John live albums